Hello Birdy is an Australian documentary television series presented by William McInnes. The first part of the six-part series aired on ABC1 on 1 February 2014.

Australian Broadcasting Corporation original programming
2010s Australian documentary television series
2014 Australian television series debuts
2014 Australian television series endings